Portland Book Festival (formerly Wordstock) is an annual literary festival held in Portland, Oregon, United States, started in 2005. It is the largest festival of its kind in the Pacific Northwest.  Events include author readings, writing contests and workshops, exhibits, and a book fair. It is spread over several building around the South Park Blocks in downtown. 

Called "the city's annual indulgence in new literary works" by The Oregonian, the festival is held by the non-profit Literary Arts, which also sponsors the Oregon Book Award. Venues include Portland Art Museum, First Congregational United Church of Christ, The Old Church, Oregon Historical Society, Northwest Film Center, the Brunish Theatre, the Winningstad Theatre, and the Arlene Schnitzer Concert Hall. The Northwest Film Center collaborates with Literary Arts, sponsoring film screenings with writers discussing films that have influenced their works.

References

External links

Literary Arts archived Book Festival podcast lectures (audio, 52:20)

2005 establishments in Oregon
Annual events in Portland, Oregon
Festivals established in 2005
Festivals in Portland, Oregon
Literary festivals in the United States